Mariano Abarca Roblero (1958–2009) was a community activist known for leading opposition against mining by Blackfire Exploration in his community of Chicomuselo in the state of Chiapas in Southern Mexico. He was a member of the Red Mexicana de Afectados por la Minería (REMA). He was assassinated on November 27, 2009 and was survived by his wife and four children.

Assassination
Mariano Abarca was assassinated on the night of November 27, 2009 in Chicomuselo in front of his house. Abarca was shot in the head and chest by a man on a motorcycle who was allegedly a Blackfire employee. Mariano Abarca had previously been abducted in August 2009, and again received death threats in the week and had filed a  complaint against the company one day prior to his death. On July 31, 2019, the Canadian government denied that its embassy in Mexico had anything to do with the coverup of the 2009 his murder. Family members vow to continue the struggle.

References

External links

 
Mariano Abarca Roblero, a tres años de su asesinato 
 https://archive.today/20130815224150/http://cuadrivio.net/2011/07/poemas-de-sarah-clancy/

1958 births
2009 deaths
Assassinated Mexican people
Mexican activists
2009 murders in Mexico